Norrköping Synagogue is a historic synagogue in located in the Nordantill borough,
Norrköping, Sweden.

In accordance with the statute from 1782, Norrköping along with Stockholm and Gothenburg became the only cities where Jews were permitted to settle permanently at that time. A previous smaller synagogue had been built in 1790s, funded by the German-Jewish merchant Jacob Marcus. The current synagogue was built between 1855 and 1858 in a neoclassical manner based on designs made by the architects Edvard Medén and Carl Stål.

Current status
The synagogue no longer hosts regular services of worship due to the decline of the Jewish population in the area. However, the building is still used occasionally for concerts and other events. The synagogue has been classified as a listed building since 1978.

References

1858 establishments in Sweden
Ashkenazi Jewish culture in Sweden
Buildings and structures in Norrköping
Synagogues in Sweden
Judaism in Sweden
Jewish Swedish history
Neoclassical synagogues
Synagogues completed in 1858